Xericeps is a genus of pterosaur from the Late Cretaceous Kem Kem Beds (which date to the late Albian or Cenomanian age) of southeastern Morocco.

Description
Xericeps is a medium-sized edentulous (toothless) pterosaur. The term 'medium-sized', in the context of pterosaurs, is generally used to describe pterosaurs with a wingspan of 3–8 metres, and it is likely that Xericeps was nearer the lower end of this range.

The holotype specimen is a partial anterior lower jaw, likely broken off right anterior to where the mandibular rami diverged. The jaw is upturned, with the occluding surface curved in lateral view. On the dorsal surface of the mandibular symphysis are a pair of ridges, similar to those seen in Alanqa and Argentinadraco.

Classification
A 2021 study focused on Aerotitan recovers it as a chaoyangopterid closely related to Argentinadraco.

Discovery and naming
The holotype specimen - FSAC-KK-10700 was discovered by local mine workers at Aferdou N'Chaft, a small mesa near the oasis village of Hassi el Begaa in the Errachidia Province in south eastern Morocco on the Algerian border, and consists only of the pterosaur's fragmented jaws. The specimen was purchased directly at the mine site by British palaeontologist David M. Martill in January 2017, and thus it is possible to confidently establish its precise locality and stratigraphic horizon.

It is believed that Xericeps lived in the mid-Cretaceous period around the Albian-Cenomanian ages (93.9-113.0 Ma).

The holotype specimen's species epithet - "curvirostris" - comes from the Latin curvus, meaning "curved" and rostrum meaning snout, or muzzle. This is due to the specimen's noticeably upward-curved beak.

See also
 Timeline of pterosaur research
 List of pterosaurs
 2018 in paleontology

References 

Early Cretaceous pterosaurs
Chaoyangopterids
Early Cretaceous reptiles of Africa
Late Cretaceous pterosaurs of Africa
Fossil taxa described in 2018
Pterosaurs of Africa
Albian genus first appearances
Cenomanian genus extinctions